Guihaiothamnus is a monotypic genus of flowering plants in the family Rubiaceae. The genus contains only one species, viz. Guihaiothamnus acaulis, which is only found in Rongshui County in southern China.

References

Monotypic Rubiaceae genera
Augusteae